Era d'estate (It Was in the Summer) is an Italian biographical drama film directed by Fiorella Infascelli, starring Giuseppe Fiorello and Massimo Popolizio, based on the permanence of judges Paolo Borsellino and Giovanni Falcone on the Asinara island.

Plot
On 13 August 1985, judges Giovanni Falcone and Paolo Borsellino are sent, together with their families, on the Asinara island in Sardinia in order to keep them safe from Cosa Nostra, who wants to kill them after the arrest of several members of the crime organization.

Falcone and Borsellino stood on the island, isolated from the world, annoyed by the fact that they can't help with the trials and the investigations, but knowing they need to stay there for the safety of their families.

Cast
 Giuseppe Fiorello as Paolo Borsellino
 Massimo Popolizio as Giovanni Falcone
 Valeria Solarino as Francesca Morvillo, Falcone's wife
 Claudia Potenza as Agnese Piraino Leto, Borsellino's wife

Awards and nominations

David di Donatello (2017)
 Nomination for David di Donatello for Best Adapted Screenplay to Fiorella Infascelli and Antonio Leotti

References

External links

2016 films
2016 biographical drama films
Italian biographical drama films
2010s Italian-language films
Films set in the 1980s
Films set in Sardinia
2016 drama films
Fandango (Italian company) films
Rai Cinema films